, also known by his Chinese style name , was a bureaucrat of the Ryukyu Kingdom. 

Ryōtei was born to an aristocrat family called Ba-uji Miyahira Dunchi. He served as a member of sanshikan from 1755 to 1782. During his term, he put forward a proposals for make the first statutory law in Ryukyuan history together with his two colleges, Wakugawa Chōkyō and Yonabaru Ryōku, and the sessei Yuntanza Chōkō in 1775. This proposal was approved by King Shō Boku. The law was completed in 1786.

References

Sanshikan
People of the Ryukyu Kingdom
Ryukyuan people
18th-century Ryukyuan people